Wadjet eye may refer to:

 The Eye of Horus, which is sometimes known as a Wadjet Eye
 Wadjet Eye Games, an indie video game developer that specializes in point and click adventure games